Angelos Fetsis (born 1878, date of death unknown) was a Greek athlete.  He competed at the 1896 Summer Olympics in Athens. He was born in Lefkada.

Fetsis competed in the 800 metres event.  He placed either fourth or fifth in his preliminary heat, though records do not indicate whether he was ahead or behind countryman Dimitrios Tomprof.  Neither advanced to the finals, however, as a second-place finish was required for advancement.

He also competed in the 1500 metres event.  He placed in the bottom half of the eight runners who took part in the single race of the event, though his exact placing is unclear.

References

External links

1878 births
Year of death missing
Greek male middle-distance runners
Olympic athletes of Greece
Athletes (track and field) at the 1896 Summer Olympics
19th-century sportsmen
People from Lefkada
Date of death unknown
Sportspeople from the Ionian Islands (region)